These are the official results of the Men's Marathon event at the 1990 European Championships in Split, Yugoslavia. The final was held on 1 September 1990.

Medalists

Abbreviations
All times shown are in hours:minutes:seconds

Final ranking
1 September

Participation
According to an unofficial count, 37 athletes from 19 countries participated in the event.

 (1)
 (2)
 (1)
 (1)
 (2)
 (2)
 (2)
 (3)
 (3)
 (1)
 (1)
 (3)
 (1)
 (3)
 (3)
 (3)
 (1)
 (2)
 (2)

See also
 1988 Men's Olympic Marathon (Seoul)
 1990 Marathon Year Ranking
 1991 Men's World Championships Marathon (Tokyo)
 1992 Men's Olympic Marathon (Barcelona)

References

External links
 Results
 marathonspiegel

Marathon
Marathons at the European Athletics Championships
1990 marathons
Men's marathons